Sporisorium ehrenbergi (syn. Tolyposporium ehrenbergi) is a species of fungus in the Ustilaginaceae family. It is a plant pathogen, causing long smut of Sorghum spp.

References 

Fungal plant pathogens and diseases
Sorghum diseases
Ustilaginomycotina
Fungi described in 1903